The NWA National Tag Team Championship was the major tag team title in the NWA-affiliated Georgia Championship Wrestling from 1980 until 1986. The championship was introduced in November 1980 when Georgia Tag Team Champions The Fabulous Freebirds (Michael Hayes, Buddy Roberts, and Terry Gordy) won a tournament to determine the first champions, defeating Stan Frazier and Robert Fuller in the final. They were introduced as the Georgia and National Tag Team Champions and carried a trophy to the ring representing the National title as they wore belts which represented the Georgia title.

The National Tag Team Championship continued to be represented by a trophy until Thanksgiving Night in 1981, when the promotion awarded newly made belts (modeled after the old Georgia tag team belts, which the National title replaced) to the winners of its annual turkey night tag team tournament. The father and son duo of Bob and Brad Armstrong defeated Mr. Fuji and Mr. Saito in the final to win the vacant NWA National Tag Team Championship.

When World Wrestling Entertainment (then called the World Wrestling Federation)'s Vince McMahon bought Georgia Championship Wrestling, Inc.'s TV timeslot (after GCW's contract with TBS expired without renewal: Black Saturday), the titleholders were Ron Garvin and Jerry Oates. After Oates and Garvin refused to sign with McMahon, McMahon discontinued the title.

A new wrestling promotion -- containing some former Georgia Championship Wrestling personnel -- Championship Wrestling from Georgia reactivated the title, and recognized Garvin & Oates as the titleholders, keeping the Georgia Championship Wrestling lineage unbroken. Jim Crockett Promotions bought the TBS wrestling timeslot from the WWF in 1985 -- and Championship Wrestling from Georgia (including CWG's Saturday morning TBS timeslot, as well) -- kept the title active. The title was written out of JCP storylines when titleholders Ole Anderson & Arn Anderson were stripped of the belts, and JCP replaced them by establishing its 'new' United States Tag Team Championship, and a tournament to crown its 'first' champions.

Title history

See also
National Wrestling Alliance
Jim Crockett Promotions

References

Georgia Championship Wrestling championships
Jim Crockett Promotions championships
National Wrestling Alliance championships
Regional professional wrestling championships